The Swiss Association of Actuaries (SAA) is the association of actuaries in Switzerland. The association was established in 1905. It is a full member of the International Actuarial Association and the Groupe Consultatif. As of 2017 (June), the association has 1 364 members, 778 of them fully qualified. Current president of the association is Klemens Binswanger.

External links

 Swiss Association of Actuaries official website

Actuarial associations